Madeline A. Cain (November 21, 1949 – April 4, 2022) was a member of the Ohio House of Representatives and the first woman mayor of Lakewood, Ohio. Cain had previously represented a portion of Cuyahoga County for four terms (7 years) in the Ohio House of Representatives.

Early years
The second of four daughters born to Mary Rita ( Quinn) and Edward V. Cain, she grew up on West 104th street in Cleveland. Her father was a Cleveland prosecutor.

She attended St. Augustine Academy and, at age 18, joined the Sisters of Charity. She served eight years with the Catholic Church, graduating from Ursuline College with a degree in English and Theology and subsequently teaching at her alma mater.

Affiliations
Cain was active in several political and civic organizations, including Lakewood Business and Professional Women, Lakewood Chamber of Commerce, Cudell Neighborhood Improvement Inc., West Boulevard Neighborhood Association, Citizens League of Greater Cleveland, Cuyahoga County Women’s Political Caucus, Lakewood Democratic Club, City Club, Cuyahoga County Democratic party, and the Ohio Women's Policy and Research Commission.

References

Further reading
 
 
 
 
 
 
 
 
 
 

1949 births
2022 deaths
20th-century American politicians
21st-century American politicians
Mayors of places in Ohio
Democratic Party members of the Ohio House of Representatives
Politicians from Cleveland
Women mayors of places in Ohio
Women state legislators in Ohio
21st-century American women politicians
20th-century American women politicians